Ken Cameron (born 1946) is an Australian film and television director and writer. Cameron was born in Tenterfield, New South Wales, Australia and graduated from Sydney University with BA in 1968. He has won two AFI Awards for directing.

Filmography
 The Strip (2008) TV
 White Collar Blue  (2002) TV
 My Brother Jack (2001) (TV)
 Halifax f.p: A Person of Interest (2000) TV
 Secret Men's Business (1999) TV
 Miracle at Midnight (1998) TV
 Payback (1997) TV
 Dalva (1996) TV
 Bordertown (1995) TV mini-series
 Oldest Living Confederate Widow Tells All (1994) TV
 Joh's Jury (1993) TV
 Brides of Christ (1991) TV mini-series
 Police Crop: The Winchester Conspiracy (1990) TV
 Bangkok Hilton (1989) TV mini-series
 The Clean Machine (1988) TV
 Stringer (1988) TV series
 The Umbrella Woman (1987)
 Crime of the Decade (1984) TV
 Fast Talking (1984)
 On the Loose (1984) - writer only
 Monkey Grip (1982)
 Temperament Unsuited (1978) - short
 Out of It (1977)

Unmade films
 Matilda, My Darling - story of Waltzing Matilda

References

External links
 

Australian film directors
1946 births
Living people